"Put Your Hands Up" is a single by LL Cool J from the hip-hop compilation album, Violator: The Album, V2.0. It was released in 2001 for Violator Records and was written and produced from LL and Swizz Beatz. Put Your Hands Up spent 1 week on the Hot Rap Singles chart, peaking at #50.

Track listing

A-Side
"Put Your Hands Up" (Clean Version)- 3:45

B-Side
"Put Your Hands Up" (Dirty Version)- 3:45
"Put Your Hands Up" (Instrumental)- 3:45

References

2001 singles
2001 songs
LL Cool J songs
Song recordings produced by Swizz Beatz
Songs written by LL Cool J
Songs written by Swizz Beatz